The Roman Catholic Diocese of Almería  is a diocese located in the city of Almería in the Ecclesiastical province of Granada in Spain.

History
 May 21, 1492: Established as Diocese of Almería from the Titular Episcopal See of Vergi

Special churches
Minor Basilicas:
Basílica de Nuestra Señora de las Mercedes, Oria, Almería, Andalucía

Leadership
Bishops of Almería (Roman rite)
Juan de Ortega (21 May 1492 – 1515 Died)
Francisco Sosa (1 Jun 1515 – 1 Jul 1520 Died)
Juan González Meneses (17 Sep 1520 – 28 Jun 1521 Died)
Diego Fernández de Villalán, O.F.M. (17 Jul 1523 – 7 Jul 1556 Died)
Antonio Corrionero de Babilafuente (10 Dec 1557 – 13 May 1570 Died)
Francisco Briceño (5 Mar 1571  – 30 Jul 1571 Died)
Diego González (9 Jun 1572 – 11 Jan 1587 Died)
Juan García (17 Aug 1597 – 31 Dec 1601 Died)
Juan Portocarrero, O.F.M. (26 Aug 1602 – 8 Mar 1631 Died)
Antonio Viedma Chaves, O.P. (8 Mar 1631 – 9 Jun 1631 Died)
Martín García Ceniceros (2 Aug 1632 – Oct 1632 Died)
Bartolomé Santos de Risoba (6 Jun 1633 – 26 Sep 1633 Appointed, Bishop of León) 
Antonio González Acevedo (19 Dec 1633 – 5 Oct 1637 Appointed, Bishop of Coria) 
José Valle de la Cerda, O.S.B. (19 Nov 1637 – 17 Dec 1640 Confirmed, Bishop of Badajoz) 
José de Argáiz Pérez (1 Jul 1641 – 4 Dec 1645 Appointed, Bishop of Ávila) 
Luis Venegas Figueroa (5 Feb 1646  – 30 May 1651 Died) 
Alfonso de Sanvítores de la Portilla, O.S.B. (28 Oct 1651 – 1 Sep 1653 Appointed, Bishop of Orense) 
Enrique Peralta y Cárdenas (26 Jan 1654 – 13 Jan 1659 Confirmed, Bishop of Palencia) 
Alfonso Pérez de Humanares, O. Cist. (9 Jun 1659 – 12 Feb 1663 Appointed, Bishop of Cádiz) 
Rodrigo de Mandia y Parga (9 Apr 1663 – 12 Dec 1672 Appointed, Bishop of Astorga) 
Francisco Antonio Sarmiento de Luna y Enríquez, O.S.A. (25 Sep 1673 – 27 May 1675 Appointed, Bishop of Coria) 
Antonio Ibarra (15 Jul 1675 – 18 Nov 1680 Appointed, Bishop of Cádiz) 
Juan Grande Santos de San Pedro (13 Jan 1681 – 15 Nov 1683 Appointed, Bishop of Pamplona) 
Andrés de La Moneda Cañas y Silva, O.S.B. (20 Dec 1683 – 13 Mar 1687 Died) 
Domingo de Orueta y Caceaga (10 Nov 1687 – 4 Mar 1701 Died) 
Juan Leyva (8 Aug 1701 – 15 Mar 1704 Died) 
Juan Bonilla Vargas, O.SS.T. (15 Dec 1704 – 11 Apr 1707 Appointed, Bishop of Córdoba) 
Manuel de Santo Tomás y Mendoza, O.P. (7 Jun 1707 – 11 Dec 1713 Confirmed, Bishop of Malaga) 
Jerónimo del Valle Ledesma (21 Mar 1714 – 12 Nov 1722 Died) 
José Pereto Ricarte, O. de M. (12 Apr 1723 – 28 Mar 1730 Died) 
José  Marín y Ibáñez (22 Nov 1730 – 8 Jan 1734 Died) 
Diego Felipe de Perea Magdaleno (17 Jan 1735 – 29 May 1741 Appointed, Archbishop of Burgos) 
Gaspar de Molina y Rocha, O.S.A. (29 May 1741 – 4 Dec 1760 Died) 
Claudio Sanz Torres y Ruiz Castañedo (13 Jul 1761 – 15 Jul 1779 Died) 
Anselmo Rodríguez Merino, O.S.B. (18 Sep 1780 – 14 Jan 1798 Died) 
Juan Antonio Viana, O.C.D. (14 Aug 1798 – 28 Jan 1800 Died) 
Francisco Javier Mier y Campillo (24 May 1802 – 16 Dec 1815 Resigned) 
Antonio Pérez Minayo (16 Mar 1818 – 29 Aug 1833 Died) 
Anacleto Meoro Sánchez (17 Dec 1847 – 2 Jan 1864 Died) 
Andrés Rosales y Muñoz (22 Sep 1864 – 10 Oct 1872 Died) 
José María Orberá y Carrión (23 Sep 1875 – 23 Nov 1886 Died) 
Santos Zárate y Martínez (17 Mar 1887 – 7 Aug 1906 Died) 
Vicente Casanova y Marzol (19 Dec 1907 – 7 Mar 1921 Appointed, Archbishop of Granada) 
Bernardo Martínez y Noval, O.S.A. (18 Jul 1921 – 24 Jun 1934 Died) 
Blessed Diego Ventaja Milán (1 May 1935 – 30 Aug 1936 Killed) 
Enrique Delgado y Gómez (10 Jun 1943 – 26 Oct 1946 Appointed, Bishop of Pamplona) 
Alfonso Ródenas García (24 Apr 1947 – 7 Nov 1965 Died) 
Ángel Suquía Goicoechea (17 May 1966 – 28 Nov 1969 Appointed, Bishop of Malaga) 
Manuel Casares Hervás (6 Apr 1970 – 12 May 1989 Resigned) 
Rosendo Álvarez Gastón (12 May 1989 – 15 Apr 2002 Retired) 
Adolfo González Montes (15 Apr 2002 – 30 Nov 2021 Retired)
Antonio Gómez Cantero (30 Nov 2021 – present)

See also
Roman Catholicism in Spain

References

Sources

 GCatholic.org
 Catholic Hierarchy
  Diocese website

Almería
Roman Catholic dioceses in Spain
Religious organizations established in the 1490s
Roman Catholic dioceses established in the 15th century
1492 establishments in Europe